Extra Soul Perception is an album by saxophonist Monk Higgins recorded in 1968 and released on the Solid State label.

Track listing 
All compositions by Monk Higgins except where noted
 "Extra Soul Perception" – 2:35
 "The Look of Slim" – 3:00
 "A Good Thing" (Dee Ervin) – 2:30
 "Watermelon Man" (Herbie Hancock) – 3:10
 "Straight Ahead" (Vee Pea) – 2:40
 "Canadian Sunset" (Eddie Heywood, Norman Gimbel) – 3:56
 "Collision in Black" – 4:00
 "Just Around the Corner" (Pea) – 2:58
 "Little Green Apples" (Bobby Russell) – 2:25
 "Poker Chips" (Pea) – 3:08
 "Sittin' Duck" – 3:00
 "Doing It to Deff" – 2:50

Personnel 
Monk Higgins – tenor saxophone, organ, arranger
Bill Peterson – trumpet, flugelhorn
Thomas Scott – trumpet
David Duke – French horn
Jim Horn – flute
Miles Grayson – piano, percussion
Arthur Adams, Freddy Robinson, Albert Vescovo – guitar
Bob West, Ron Brown – electric bass
John Guerin – drums
Dee Ervin – percussion, organ
Alan Estes – vibraphone, percussion
Jerry Williams – congas
Strings directed by Sidney Sharp

References 

1969 albums
Solid State Records (jazz label) albums